VZ Group is a Swiss financial services provider headquartered in Zurich. VZ Holding Ltd has been listed on the SIX Swiss Exchange since March 2007.

VZ Group specialises in retirement planning and portfolio management for individuals as well as in insurance and pension fund management for companies.

Matthias Reinhart has founded VZ Group and is the main shareholder. He holds 61 percent of the voting rights (directly and indirectly).

History 

The company was founded in 1993 by Matthias Reinhart and Max Bolanz as VZ VersicherungsZentrum Ltd. Their aim was to bring transparency to the insurance and banking industries in Switzerland by comparing prices and benefits. The initial purpose of the company included the brokerage of insurance contracts.

Subsequently, the range of services was continuously expanded. In 1997, the name was changed to VZ VermögensZentrum Ltd, and the articles of association were amended. Since then, the focus shifted from brokering to financial consulting and portfolio management.

In 2000, a holding structure was introduced. In March 2007, the subsidiary VZ Depository Bank Ltd was authorised as a bank and securities dealer by the Swiss Federal Banking Commission. In the same month, VZ Holding Ltd went public.

VZ Vorsorge Ltd was founded in 2013 as a wholly owned subsidiary of VZ Holding. The unit provides services such as consultancy, administration and management for investment funds, pension funds and occupational benefit schemes.

Subsidiaries 
VZ Group is organised as a holding company and comprises a.o. the following subsidiaries:

 VZ VermögensZentrum AG, Zurich: financial consulting and wealth management for individuals in Switzerland
 VZ VermögensZentrum GmbH, Munich: financial consulting and wealth management for individuals in Germany
 VZ Depository Bank AG, Zug: securities accounts, securities and currency transactions, portfolio advisory and management for private clients and institutional investors
 VZ Depotbank Deutschland AG, Munich: banking services for individuals in Germany
HypothekenZentrum AG, Zurich: management of mortgages and transfer of mortgages to institutional investors
 VZ Insurance Services AG, Zurich: risk management consulting as well as insurance and pension fund management for corporations
 VZ Versicherungs-Pool AG, Zurich: property and casualty insurances for individuals in Switzerland
 VZ Vorsorge AG, Zurich: consulting and management services for investment foundations and institutions providing occupational benefit schemes

Board of Directors 
The Board of Directors consists of Fred Kindle, Dr. Albrecht Langhart, Roland Iff, Roland Ledergeber, and Olivier de Perregaux.

Ownership 
The ownership structure, :

References

External links 
 VZ Holding Ltd
 VZ VermögensZentrum Ltd (Switzerland)
 VZ VermögensZentrum GmbH (Germany, Website in German)
 VZ Depository Bank Ltd (Switzerland)
 VZ Insurance Services Ltd
 HypothekenZentrum Ltd (Website in German)
 VZ Vorsorge Ltd (in German)

External links 
 VZ Holding Ltd

Financial services companies established in 1993
Financial services companies of Switzerland
Companies based in Zürich
Swiss brands
Companies listed on the SIX Swiss Exchange